The 1994 European motorcycle Grand Prix was the last round of the 1994 Grand Prix motorcycle racing season. It took place on 9 October 1994 at the Circuit de Catalunya.

500 cc classification

250 cc classification

125 cc classification

References

European motorcycle Grand Prix
European
European Motorcycle